Walker's Nonsuch Ltd. is a manufacturer of toffee based in Longton, Stoke-on-Trent, England, UK. It was founded in 1894 by Edward Joseph Walker and his son Edward Victor Walker.

See also
Toffee hammer

External links
Official Website

Brand name confectionery
Confectionery companies of the United Kingdom
Food brands of the United Kingdom